David Apasera is a Ghanaian politician of the Republic of Ghana. He was the Member of Parliament representing Bolgatanga constituency of the Upper East Region of Ghana in the 4th Parliament of the 4th Republic of Ghana. He is a member of the People's National Convention.

Early life and education 
Apasera was born on April 25, 1962. He holds a GCE A Level certificate.

Career 
Apasera is a self-employed Ghanaian politician.

Political career 
Apasera was a member of the People's National Convention. He became a member of parliament from January 2001 after emerging winner in the General Election in December 2000. He was elected as the member of parliament for the Bolgatanga constituency in the fourth parliament of the fourth Republic of Ghana.

Elections 
Apasera was elected as the member of parliament for the Bolgatanga constituency of the Upper East Region of Ghana for the first time in the 2000 Ghanaian general elections.  He won on the ticket of the People's National Convention. His constituency was a part of the 3 parliamentary seats out of 13 seats won by the  National Democratic Congress in that election for the Upper East Region.

The People's National Convention won a minority total of 4 parliamentary seats out of 230 seats.  He was elected with 18,948 votes out of 49,101 total valid votes cast. This was equivalent to 38.6% of total valid votes cast. He was elected over Gheysika Adombire Agambila of the New Patriotic Party, Akolbire Emmanuel Opam-Brown of the National Democratic Congress, Evelyn Lamisi Anabila of the Convention People's Party, Awuni Atiah Solomon of the Democratic People's Party and Amoshie Baba Julius an independent candidate.

These obtained 11,547, 16,743, 564, 345 and 954 votes respectively of total votes cast. These were equivalent to 23.5%, 43.1%, 0.8%, 0.3%  and 3.7% respectively of total valid votes cast.

Personal life 
Apasera is a Christian. Apasera ia married with four children.

See also 

 List of MPs elected in the 2004 Ghanaian parliamentary election

References 

Living people
1962 births
Ghanaian MPs 2005–2009
Ghanaian MPs 2001–2005
National Democratic Congress (Ghana) politicians